Yuliya Ravilyevna Garayeva (born 27 July 1968) is  a former Russian fencer of Tatar descent, who won bronze Olympic medals in the team épée competition at the 1996 Summer Olympics in Atlanta.

References

1968 births
Tatar people of Russia
Volga Tatar people
Tatar sportspeople
Living people
Russian female épée fencers
Fencers at the 1996 Summer Olympics
Olympic fencers of Russia
Olympic bronze medalists for Russia
Olympic medalists in fencing
Martial artists from Moscow
Medalists at the 1996 Summer Olympics
20th-century Russian women